The 1996 United States House of Representatives election in Vermont was held on Tuesday, November 5, 1996, to elect the U.S. representative from the state's at-large congressional district. The election coincided with the elections of other federal and state offices, including a quadrennial presidential election.

Republican primary

Democratic primary

Liberty Union primary

General election

Candidates
Peter Diamondstone (Liberty Union), perennial candidate and socialist activist
Norio Kushi (Natural Law), organic foods consultant
Jack Long (Democratic), lawyer
Robert Melamede (Grassroots), associate research professor at the University of Vermont
Thomas J. Morse (Libertarian), businessman
Bernie Sanders (Independent), incumbent U.S. Representative
Susan Sweetser (Republican), state senator

Campaign
National Republicans were eager to unseat Sanders, and had placed him on a list of 10 incumbent Representatives they would most heavily target in the 1996 cycle. The Republican nominee, state senator Susan Sweetser, was viewed as a rising star within the party and campaigned as a "social moderate and fiscal conservative", though she was viewed as a strictly conservative Republican. Sweetser's gender was viewed as a potential advantage by University of Vermont political analyst Garrison Nelson, who felt that it would prevent Sanders from utilising his traditional aggressive campaign style. There was also a prominent Democratic candidate in the form of Jack Long, former commissioner of the Vermont Environmental Conservation Department, who campaigned as a moderate alternative to the other major candidates. Long's campaign faced staunch opposition from national Democratic strategists, with Rob Engel, political director of the Democratic Congressional Campaign Committee, accusing him of being a spoiler candidate attempting to throw the election to Sweetser.

Sweetser's campaign faced a major scandal after it was revealed that she had hired private investigator Cathy Riggs, the wife of California Congressman Frank Riggs, to perform opposition research on Sanders, with Riggs proceeding to investigate Sanders' first marriage by calling his ex-wife. This tactic was denounced by both Sanders and Long as a violation of privacy and political etiquette. Sweetser quickly apologised and claimed that she was not aware of Riggs' activities, but the event severely damaged her campaign nonetheless, as it was largely viewed as unacceptable "dirty campaigning" by the electorate.

Polling

Endorsements

Results

References

1996
Vermont
1996 Vermont elections
Bernie Sanders